The Wells Fargo Tower, formerly known as the First Union Signet Tower, Wachovia Tower, and Union Trust Building, is a commercial high-rise in Baltimore, Maryland. The structure was completed in 1985. The Wells Fargo Tower was developed by the Dallas-based Trammell Crow Company, and is currently owned by the Wells Fargo and Company. The structure is an example of modern architecture, and has a glass, steel and concrete façade. The Wachovia Tower rises from the site formerly occupied by the Calvert Building and 7-9 Saint Paul Street. The building, formerly housing offices for Wachovia, is now home to the regional office of Wells Fargo and Company.

See also
 List of tallest buildings in Baltimore

References

Downtown Baltimore
Skyscraper office buildings in Baltimore
Bank buildings in Maryland
Office buildings completed in 1985

Wells Fargo buildings